María Yesica Ramos Cesari (born 11 August 1995) is a Bolivian footballer who plays as a forward for the Bolivia women's national team.

Early life
Ramos hails from the Santa Cruz Department.

International career
Ramos played for Bolivia at senior level in the 2018 Copa América Femenina.

References

1995 births
Living people
Women's association football forwards
Bolivian women's footballers
People from Santa Cruz Department (Bolivia)
Bolivia women's international footballers